The California State Board of Education is the governing and policy-making body of the California Department of Education. The State Board of Education sets K-12 education policy in the areas of standards, instructional materials, assessment, and accountability. The State Board of Education adopts textbooks for grades K-8, adopts regulations to implement legislation, and has authority to grant waivers of the Education Code. Content standards are designed to encourage the highest achievement of every student, by defining the knowledge, concepts, and skills that students should acquire at each grade level. The State Board of Education has eleven members, including one student member, all appointed by the Governor of California. The student member is selected from a group of three students nominated by the board. Those are picked from the delegation of the Student Advisory Board on Education, a conference run by the California Association of Student Councils.

The State Board of Education is responsible for the maintenance of such programs as No Child Left Behind Act, the administration of the Standardized Testing and Reporting program (used for student and school accountability), and the Academic Performance Index, which measures the academic performance and growth of schools on a variety of academic measures.

See also
 California State Superintendent of Public Instruction
 California Charter Academy

External links
State Board of Education

California State Board
State Board of Education
State boards of education in the United States